Moneywort is a common name for several plants and may refer to:

Alysicarpus
Bacopa monnieri
Lysimachia nummularia
Sibthorpia europaea